Pethia ornatus is a species of cyprinid fish found in the Lokchou River in Manipur, India and in Yu Chuang, Myanmar.  This species can reach a length of  SL.

References 

Pethia
Barbs (fish)
Fish described in 2004